The S2 22 is an American trailerable sailboat that was designed by Don Wennersten and Graham & Schlageter as a cruiser and first built in 1985.

The S2 22 is derived from the 1983 Graham & Schlageter-designed S2 6.9, which itself was a development of the 1980 Wennersten S2 6.7 design.

Production
The design was built by S2 Yachts in Holland, Michigan, United States, from 1985 until 1987, with 21 boats completed, but it is now out of production.

Design
The S2 22 is a recreational keelboat, built predominantly of solid fiberglass, with wood trim. It has a fractional sloop rig, a raked stem, a plumb transom, a transom-hung rudder controlled by a tiller and a fixed wing keel. It displaces  and carries  of ballast.

See also
List of sailing boat types

References

External links
Photo of an S2 22
Photo of the interior of an S2 22

Keelboats
1980s sailboat type designs
Sailing yachts
Trailer sailers
Sailboat type designs by Don Wennersten
Sailboat type designs by Graham & Schlageter
Sailboat types built by S2 Yachts